Sutapa Basu is an Indian author, most known for her works Dangle, Padmavati and Genghis Khan.

Education and Work 
Basu was born in Bankura, West Bengal. She graduated from Convent of Jesus and Mary at Ambala. She completed graduation with Honours in English Literature from Visvabharati University, Santiniketan and post graduation from HN Bahuguna University, Uttarakhand. She also holds a teaching degree from Maharaja Sayaji Rao University, Vadodara. Sutapa has worked with Oxford University Press, Encyclopædia Britannica and Readomania. She lives in Delhi with her husband, an ex-Army Colonel.

Writing 
Basu is the author of Dangle and Padmavati. She was the editor of Chronicles of Urban Nomads, Crossed and Knotted, Rudraksha - When Gods Came Calling and a contributor to Defiant Dreams and When They Spoke. Sutapa Basu won the first position for writing a short story in the genre of mythological-fiction in response to the prompt given by author Amish Tripathi in the 2017 TOI Write India Season 1.  Basu was nominated for the Pune International Literary Fest's Anupam Kher Award for Best Debut English Novel in 2017. Basu's story, "Classroom Wiles" that talks about an English Teacher's first day at school, was one of the stories in a play directed by Sujata Soni Bali called "Once Upon a Time."

Awards 
Basu's historical novel, The Curse of Nader Shah won the Best Fiction Award by AutHer Awards, 2020, instituted by JK papers and the Times of India. In 2016, she won the First Prize of the Times of India Write India Campaign for Amish Tripathi. Her debut novel, Dangle, was nominated for the Anupam Kher Award for Best Debut English Novel in 2017. In March 2021, she received an award for Excellence in Publishing by the Public Diplomacy Forum.

Books 

The Cursed Inheritance (Readomania, 2021)

Princesses, Monsters, and Magical Creatures (Readomania, 2021)

Out of the Blue, Stories with a Twist (Readomania, 2020)

The Anatomy of Affection, Tales that Touch You (Readomania, 2020) 

The Curse of Nader Shah (Readomania, 2019) 

The Legend of Genghis Khan (Readomania, 2018)

Padmavati, The Queen Tells Her Own Story (Readomania, 2017)

References 

Living people
21st-century Indian novelists
Indian women novelists
Novelists from West Bengal
People from Bankura
Women writers from West Bengal
21st-century Indian women writers
21st-century Indian writers
Year of birth missing (living people)